Chris Kelly (born 14 October 1948) is an English former professional footballer who played in the Football League, as a forward.
Kelly began his career at Tooting & Mitcham United before becoming a vital part of Leatherhead's cup run in 1974–1975. As a result of this Kelly received minor celebrity status and because of his outspoken comments became known as the "Leatherhead Lip". On the back of the cup run, Kelly made a brief but unsuccessful move to Millwall in 1975 after which he returned to Leatherhead where he saw out his career.

References

1948 births
Living people
Sportspeople from Epsom
English footballers
Association football forwards
Millwall F.C. players
Tooting & Mitcham United F.C. players
Leatherhead F.C. players
English Football League players
Footballers from Surrey